The Twiste is a river of Hesse and of North Rhine-Westphalia, Germany. It is the most important tributary of the Diemel, which it joins in Warburg. Its largest tributaries are the Erpe, Watter, Aar and Wande.

See also
List of rivers of Hesse
List of rivers of North Rhine-Westphalia

References

Rivers of Hesse
Rivers of North Rhine-Westphalia
Rivers of Germany